Tritek Technologies, Inc. was founded in 1984 by inventor and innovator James Malatesta. Headquartered in Wilmington, Delaware, USA, Tritek specializes in custom designed hardware and software for mail processing equipment, imaging, and vote-by-mail.  Tritek has many patents in mail sorting and processing.

Tritek provides machinery and services to Fortune 500 companies and educational institutions. Customers include J P Morgan Chase Bank and George Mason University. Washington state, Sedgwick County, Kansas, Camden County, New Jersey, the five boroughs of New York City, Napa County California, the state of Delaware, Kansas City, Missouri, and Charleston, South Carolina all rely upon Tritek's vote-by-mail technology for processing mailed-in ballots during elections.

Tritek's assembly plant is in Wilmington, Delaware where the company also operates a mail processing center. Tritek is a global company providing products and services to European countries, universities, presort mail businesses, and many US government postal operations. Tritek is a multi-million dollar privately owned company. 

Tritek has worked with well-known organizations such as Siemens, the United States Postal Service, and Lockheed Martin.

History
Tritek's sister company, Independent Computer Services (ICS), was established as a mail sorting machine service company for Canadian-based Leigh Marsland Mail Sorting Equipment in 1981. In 1984, ICS purchased the worldwide rights to Leigh Mail Sorting Technology. ICS eventually developed their own reader and computer systems to replace aging components in the legacy equipment. ICS developed an optical character reader (OCR) and named it the Model 88-5. This reader was used to presort mail on Leigh Instrument (Canada) mail sorting machines. ICS named the development company of the 88-5 Tritek Technologies. This name was derived from the three technologies used in mail sortation: conveying, computing and sorting.

In 1988, Tritek introduced the first multi-font programmable optical reader for mail processing machines. Tritek developed the first high-speed flats sorter in 1991 and named it the 91-5 Ultrasorter. The United States Postal Service tested the 91-5 under their FMBCS (flat mail barcode sorter) development project as a high speed flats sorter replacement. The Postal Service licensed Tritek's technology which is still in use today.

In 2003 Tritek developed "Rule Editor" software that sorts mail according to a custom programmed set of software rules tied to a database. This software allows organizations to sort generically addressed inbound mail pieces, handle ad mail, or forward mail to a different address.

Since 2009 Tritek Technologies has been known for handling undeliverable mail pieces the post office has returned to the sender. Returned mail often features marked-up address blocks, stickers, and stamps that obscure original addressing information making this material difficult to process with automated equipment.

Partners
Cambridge Corporate Services uses Tritek automated mail sorting machines to internally handle high volumes of mail.

Products
 Tritek Compact - Small Footprint Mail Sorter
 ACE Parcel Processing Station
 Inbound Mail Processing Equipment
 Presort Mail Processing Equipment
 Return Mail Processing Equipment
 Vote-by-Mail Processing and Signature Verification
Mail Tracking Systems
Character Recognition Software
Parcel Sorting
Mail Forwarding
Digital E-Mail Delivery
Multi-Level Sorting Systems
Rule-based Software

References

Companies based in Wilmington, Delaware
Manufacturing companies based in Delaware
1984 establishments in Delaware
American companies established in 1984
Manufacturing companies established in 1984